The Lipscomb Bisons baseball team is the varsity intercollegiate baseball team of Lipscomb University in Nashville, Tennessee, United States. The team competes in the National Collegiate Athletic Association's Division I and is a member of the ASUN Conference.

The Bisons have been to two NCAA tournaments, in 2008 and 2015.

Stadiums

Ken Dugan Field at Stephen Lee Marsh Stadium

The Bisons have played their home games at Dugan Field in Nashville since 1991. The facility has a capacity of 1,500 spectators. The playing surface is named after Ken Dugan, Lipscomb baseball coach from 1960 to 1996 and winner of over 1,000 games as head of the program. The surrounding stadium is named after Stephen Lee Marsh.

Head coaches

NCAA tournament

Player awards

Atlantic Sun award winners

Defensive Player of the Year Award
Caleb Ketchup (2022)
Michael Gigliotti (2017)
Grant Massey (2015)
Pitcher of the Year
Brady Puckett (2016)

Freshman of the Year Award
Rex Brothers (2007)

References

External links